Joel Eriksson Ek (last name sometimes stylized as Eriksson-Ek, born 29 January 1997) is a Swedish professional ice hockey centre for the  Minnesota Wild of the National Hockey League (NHL). He was drafted 20th overall by the Wild in the 2015 NHL Entry Draft.

Playing career
During his rookie SHL season in 2014–15, Eriksson Ek was extended on a first team contract for a further three-years with Färjestad BK on 12 January 2015. He was seen as one of the top ten international skaters for the 2015 NHL Entry Draft according to the NHL Central Scouting Bureau before he was selected by the Wild in the first round.

On 13 July 2015, Eriksson Ek signed a three-year, entry-level contract with the Minnesota Wild. On 22 October 2016, Eriksson Ek made his NHL debut and scored his first goal. After compiling five points in his first four games, Eriksson Ek saw his ice time diminish and in order to preserve his entry-level deal he was re-assigned back to Färjestad BK on 17 November 2016. During the 2017–18 NHL season, Eriksson Ek was called up to the NHL on 6 December 2017. After going 50 games without a goal, he broke his drought in a game against the New York Islanders on 19 February 2018.

On 21 August 2019, the Wild re-signed Eriksson Ek to a two-year, $2.975 million contract extension.

On 2 July 2021, Eriksson Ek signed an eight-year, $42 million contract extension with the Wild.

Personal life
Eriksson Ek comes from a hockey playing family as his father, Clas Eriksson, played with Färjestad BK for 13 seasons and his brother Olle was drafted by the Anaheim Ducks in the 2017 NHL Entry Draft and is currently playing for the San Diego Gulls of the AHL.

Career statistics

Regular season and playoffs

International

References

External links

1997 births
Living people
Färjestad BK players
Iowa Wild players
Minnesota Wild draft picks
Minnesota Wild players
National Hockey League first-round draft picks
Swedish ice hockey centres
Sportspeople from Karlstad
Swedish expatriate ice hockey players in the United States